Francisco Hormazábal Castillo (born 4 July 1920 — 13 January 1990) was a Chilean footballer and manager.

Career
As a youth player, Hormazábal was with club Escuela 57 from San Eugenio and the Colo-Colo youth system from 1936 to 1940. From 1941 to 1949 he played for the Colo-Colo senior team.

At international level, he represented Chile in the 1945 South American Championship with four appearances and one goal.

In 1975, he won the Primera División de Colombia title with Independiente Santa Fe as a manager, which failed to win that title in 37 years breaking the negative record in 2012.

Honours

Player

Club
Colo-Colo
 Primera División de Chile (3): 1941, 1944, 1947

Manager

Club
Palestino
 Segunda División de Chile: 1953

O'Higgins
 Segunda División de Chile: 1954

Deportes Temuco
 Segunda División de Chile: 1963

Antofagasta Portuario
 Segunda División de Chile: 1968

Colo-Colo
 Primera División de Chile: 1970

Santa Fé
 Primera División de Colombia: 1975

Huachipato
 Segunda División de Chile: 1984

References

1920 births
1990 deaths
People from Antofagasta
Chilean footballers
Chile international footballers
Chilean Primera División players
Colo-Colo footballers
Association football midfielders
Chilean football managers
Primera B de Chile managers
Chilean Primera División managers
Club Deportivo Palestino managers
O'Higgins F.C. managers
Deportes Colchagua managers
Unión Española managers
Bádminton F.C. managers
Chile national football team managers
Santiago Morning managers
Green Cross managers
Independiente Medellín managers
Deportes Antofagasta managers
Colo-Colo managers
Santiago Wanderers managers
Deportivo Pereira managers
Independiente Santa Fe managers
Unión Magdalena managers
Huachipato managers
Audax Italiano managers
Chilean expatriate football managers
Chilean expatriate sportspeople in Colombia
Expatriate football managers in Colombia